Raymond Allen Liotta (December 18, 1954 – May 26, 2022) was an American actor. He first gained attention for his role in the film Something Wild (1986), which earned him a Golden Globe Award nomination. He was best known for his portrayals of Shoeless Joe Jackson in the film Field of Dreams (1989) and Henry Hill in the film Goodfellas (1990). Liotta appeared in numerous other films, including Unlawful Entry (1992), Cop Land (1997), Hannibal (2001), Blow (2001), John Q. (2002), Identity (2003), Killing Them Softly (2012), The Place Beyond the Pines (2012), Marriage Story (2019), The Many Saints of Newark (2021), and Cocaine Bear (2023).

He won a Primetime Emmy Award for his guest role in the television series ER in 2005. He starred as Frank Sinatra in the television film The Rat Pack (1998) and Lorca in the miniseries Texas Rising (2015), both of which earned him Screen Actors Guild Award nominations, and also starred in the series Shades of Blue (2016–2018) and Black Bird (2022). He also had a prominent voice acting role as Tommy Vercetti in the video game Grand Theft Auto: Vice City (2002).

Early life
Liotta was born in Newark, New Jersey, on December 18, 1954. Having been abandoned at an orphanage, he was adopted at the age of six months by township clerk Mary (née Edgar) and auto-parts store owner Alfred Liotta. His adoptive parents were of Italian and Scottish descent. Alfred was a personnel director and president of a local Democratic Party club. His adoptive parents each unsuccessfully ran for local political office; he recalled attending parades to hand out flyers for his father's run.

Liotta had a sister, Linda, who was also adopted. He said that he knew that he was adopted as a young child, and presented a show-and-tell report on it for kindergarten. He hired a private detective to locate his biological Irish mother in the 2000s, from whom he learned his family was mostly of Scottish descent. He had one biological sister, one biological half-brother, and five biological half-sisters.

Liotta grew up in a Roman Catholic household in Union, New Jersey, although his family was not especially religious. They attended church and he received first communion and was confirmed, but the family did not pray much. He occasionally used prayer in his daily life, telling an interviewer, "... if I'm in a fix, I'll pray ... if I'm feeling uncomfortable about something, I'll say "Our Father's" and "Hail Marys" to this day." In 1973, he graduated from Union High School and was later named to the Union High School Hall of Fame.

Education
Liotta attended the University of Miami, where he studied acting and graduated with a Bachelor of Fine Arts in 1978. He performed in musicals, including Cabaret, Dames at Sea, Oklahoma, and The Sound of Music, at the University of Miami's Jerry Herman Ring Theatre.

Career
After college, Liotta moved to New York City. He got a job as a bartender at the Shubert Organization and landed an agent within six months. One of his earliest roles was as Joey Perrini on the soap opera Another World, on which he appeared from 1978 to 1981. He left the show and moved to Los Angeles. He made his film debut in 1983's The Lonely Lady. His first major acting role was Something Wild (1986), for which he received his first Golden Globe nomination, this nomination being for Best Supporting Actor – Motion Picture. In 1989, Liotta portrayed the ghost of baseball player Shoeless Joe Jackson in the fantasy/drama film Field of Dreams.

In 1990, Liotta portrayed real-life mobster Henry Hill in Martin Scorsese's universally praised and commercially successful Academy Award winning film Goodfellas. In 1992, he starred as a psychopathic cop in the thriller Unlawful Entry. He appeared in a leading role in the science-fiction/action film No Escape. In 1996, he starred in the sci-fi/thriller Unforgettable. Liotta earned critical praise for his turn in James Mangold's 1997 film Cop Land, and he received critical praise in 1998 for his performance as a compulsive gambler in Phoenix.

Liotta portrayed singer Frank Sinatra in the 1998 TV movie The Rat Pack (for which he received a Screen Actors Guild award nomination). He starred as himself in the sitcom Just Shoot Me in December 2001. In October 2002 he provided the voice of Tommy Vercetti for the 2002 video game Grand Theft Auto: Vice City. He appeared in the television drama ER in 2004, playing Charlie Metcalf in the episode "Time of Death".

The ER role earned Liotta an Emmy for Outstanding Guest Actor in a Drama Series (Liotta later spoofed himself and his Emmy win in Bee Movie). Liotta starred in the 2006 CBS television series Smith, which was pulled from the schedule after three episodes. In 2012 Liotta appeared as himself in a purely vocal role for the "What a Croc!" episode of the Disney Channel comedy series Phineas & Ferb.

Liotta played the Justice Department official Paul Krendler in the 2001 film Hannibal opposite Anthony Hopkins and Julianne Moore. Also in 2001, he played the father of drug dealer George Jung in the film Blow. In 2002 he appeared as Detective Lieutenant Henry Oak in the Joe Carnahan-directed film Narc, a role that led to an Independent Spirit Award nomination and a Phoenix Film Critics Society Awards nomination for Best Supporting Male.

He reunited with director James Mangold in 2003, alongside John Cusack and Alfred Molina, in the dark horror-thriller Identity. In 2005, he narrated Inside the Mafia for the National Geographic Channel. In 2006 he appeared in Smokin' Aces—reuniting with Narc director Carnahan, in which he portrayed an FBI agent named Donald Carruthers in one of the lead roles. In 2004, Liotta made his Broadway debut opposite Frank Langella in the Stephen Belber play Match. Ben Brantley of The New York Times described Liotta as "compelling" but "doesn't have much to work with for his Broadway debut." That same year he appeared in an advertisement for Heineken in the UK. The ads were eventually pulled by Ofcom "in breach of the advertising code for implying that stronger alcohol is better."

In 2007 Liotta appeared with John Travolta in the movie Wild Hogs, and in Battle in Seattle as the city's mayor. In 2008 he starred in Hero Wanted as a detective alongside Cuba Gooding Jr. Also in 2008, he made a guest appearance on the SpongeBob SquarePants episode "What Ever Happened to SpongeBob?". In the episode, he voices the leader of a gang called the Bubble Poppin’ Boys, who try to kill an amnesiac SpongeBob (voiced by Tom Kenny). In 2009 he appeared in Crossing Over, co-starring Harrison Ford. Liotta played Detective Harrison in the 2009 Jody Hill comedy Observe and Report as Seth Rogen's nemesis from the local police. In 2011, he starred in The Son of No One, opposite Channing Tatum and, for the first time in his career, with Al Pacino.

In the 2010s, Liotta appeared in Date Night with Steve Carell, in Charlie St. Cloud with Zac Efron, the independent drama Snowmen, and The River Sorrow, which stars Liotta as a detective alongside Christian Slater and Ving Rhames. He starred alongside Brad Pitt and James Gandolfini in the 2012 Andrew Dominik film Killing Them Softly and the 2012 Ariel Vromen film The Iceman features Liotta as the character of Roy DeMeo. He had a supporting role in Muppets Most Wanted (2014).

In 2014, he played a preacher in the faith-based film The Identical. His other 2014 projects include Kill the Messenger with Jeremy Renner, Stretch with Chris Pine, and a David Guetta video. He starred in the Western miniseries Texas Rising for The History Channel in 2015. For his performance he earned a Screen Actors Guild Award for Outstanding Performance by a Male Actor in a Miniseries or Television Movie nomination. From 2015 to 2016, he narrated the AMC docu-series The Making of the Mob. Liotta starred opposite Jennifer Lopez in Shades of Blue between 2016 and 2018. In 2018, he became a spokesperson for Pfizer's Chantix advertising campaign.

Liotta appeared as Charlie Barber's (Adam Driver) second divorce attorney, Jay Marotta in the 2019 Noah Baumbach film Marriage Story. The film received widespread critical acclaim and earned six Academy Award nominations including Best Picture. Liotta received praise for his performance with Peter Bradshaw of The Guardian declaring, "what a thrill to hear his syrupy-gravelly voice again". The Hollywood Reporter described Liotta as being in "in fine, mischievous form".  In 2021, he played twin brothers "Hollywood Dick" Moltisanti and Salvatore "Sally" Moltisanti in the film The Many Saints of Newark, a prequel to the HBO crime drama series "The Sopranos".

Liotta appeared in Cocaine Bear, a thriller film based on the true story of an American black bear that ingested a duffel bag full of cocaine in 1985. The movie, released in theaters in February of 2023, is directed by actress Elizabeth Banks and traces the aftermath of a drug runner's cocaine disappearing in a plane crash and being devoured by a bear. The movie was dedicated to his memory.

Personal life

Liotta married Michelle Grace, an actress and producer, in February 1997 after they met at a baseball game, where her former husband Mark Grace was playing for the Chicago Cubs. They had a daughter, Karsen, before divorcing amicably in 2004.

On an episode of Jay Leno's Garage, Liotta revealed that Nancy and Tina Sinatra, daughters of Frank Sinatra, once sent Liotta a horse's head in the mail. The joke was in response to Liotta's declining to play their late father in a miniseries they were working on, only to see Liotta play him in the 1998 HBO television film The Rat Pack.

In February 2007, he was charged with driving under the influence after crashing his Cadillac Escalade into two parked vehicles in Pacific Palisades. He pleaded no contest.

From his experience shooting the Western Texas Rising, Liotta continued horseback riding and said in September 2014: "I was obsessed with riding horses [on the show]. I love it now. I've never had a hobby. It might be my new hobby."

In May 2017, Liotta, along with talk show host and actress Kelly Ripa, were inducted into the New Jersey Hall of Fame.

In 2018, while discussing his role alongside Jennifer Lopez as a corrupt cop targeted by the FBI in the NBC crime drama Shades of Blue, Liotta told a reporter for Long Island Weekly:

Death and posthumous recognition
Liotta died in his sleep on May 26, 2022, at age 67, in Santo Domingo, Dominican Republic, during the filming of Dangerous Waters. At the time of his death, he was engaged to Jacy Nittolo.

Liotta was posthumously recognized on the Hollywood Walk of Fame on February 24, 2023, with his daughter Karsen collecting the recognition on his behalf.

Filmography

Film

Television

Video games

Theater

Music videos

Awards and nominations

References

External links

 
 
 Ray Liotta: An Oral History at Esquire magazine 

 

1954 births
2022 deaths
People from Union Township, Union County, New Jersey
Male actors from Newark, New Jersey
Catholics from New Jersey
American adoptees
American male film actors
American male soap opera actors
American male television actors
American male video game actors
American male voice actors
American people of Italian descent
American people of Scotch-Irish descent
American people of Scottish descent
New Jersey Democrats
California Democrats
Deaths in the Dominican Republic
Primetime Emmy Award winners
Spike Video Game Award winners
Union High School (New Jersey) alumni
University of Miami alumni
Lee Strasberg Theatre and Film Institute alumni
20th-century American male actors
21st-century American male actors